WUVI (1090 AM) was a radio station licensed to serve Charlotte Amalie, U.S. Virgin Islands. The station was owned by Three Angels Corporation and leased to the University of the Virgin Islands. Its license was cancelled September 23, 2019. The station aired a College radio format using student on-air talent from the university's radio program. News programming from Pacifica Radio was also broadcast.

History

This station received its original construction permit from the Federal Communications Commission (FCC) on August 28, 1985. The new station was assigned the call letters WIBS by the FCC on October 2, 1985. WIBS received its license to cover from the FCC on November 7, 1988.

In February 1989, Raphael A. Figueroa and Lucy E. Figueroa (doing business as Saint Thomas Broadcasters) reached an agreement to sell this station to Three Angels Corporation. The deal was approved by the FCC on July 5, 1989, and the transaction was consummated on July 31, 1989. The new owners had the FCC assign the WGOD call letters on October 5, 1989.

Expanded Band assignment

On March 17, 1997 the FCC announced that eighty-eight stations had been given permission to move to newly available "Expanded Band" transmitting frequencies, ranging from 1610 to 1700 kHz, with WGOD authorized to move from 1090 to 1690 kHz.

A construction permit for the expanded band station was assigned the call letters WIGT on August 12, 2010. The FCC's initial policy was that both the original station and its expanded band counterpart could operate simultaneously for up to five years, after which owners would have to turn in one of the two licenses, depending on whether they preferred the new assignment or elected to remain on the original frequency. This deadline was extended multiple times, and both stations remained authorized beyond the original time limit.

Later history
On September 14, 2012, the station changed its call sign to WUVI, in conjunction with Three Angels' lease of the station to the University of the Virgin Islands, which launched a college radio format on January 9, 2013.

WUVI was deleted on September 23, 2019.

Managers
 Alexander Randall 5, Faculty Advisor (2012)
 DaraMonifah Cooper, Station/Programming Manager (2013)
 Dr. Chenzira Davis-Kahina, Culture and Education Director/St. Croix Manager (2013)

On-air staff

Managers
 Alexander Randall 5, Faculty Advisor (2012)
 April Rose Fale-Knight, Station Manager (2012)
 Akila Henry, Program Manager (2013)
 Elesha Hazel, Archivist (2013)
 Marisha Jno-Lewis, News Director (2013)
 Nichole Moore, Studio Operations (2012)
 Stefan Todman, Pacifica Content (2013)
 Heru Shango, Marketing and Sales (2013)

Staff
 Shugga Deborah Rosenbloom
 Glenn Pride
 Manefa O'Connor
 Michael McFarlane
 Renee Williams
 Tatyanna Eades
 Shari Alfred
 Aletia Hodge
 Shawn Seabrookes
 Antoinette Anderson

Former on-air staff
The following individuals have been on WUVI as on-air staff:

Managers
 Twanna Hodge, Archivist (2012–13)
 Linda Ritter, News Director (2012–13)
 Leslyn Tonge, Production Manager (2012–13)
 Shugga Deborah Rosenbloom, Sunday Program Coordinator (2012–13)
 Christina Chanes, Sales (2013 - 2016)

Staff
 Marisha Jno-Lewis
 Renee Williams
 Akila Henry
 Ronnie Greenaway
 Kaeche Liburd
 Shawn Auguste
 Chinet Bernier
 Monai Greene
 Najuma Dunn
 Stefan Todman
 Shawn Seabrookes

References

External link
FCC Station Search Details: DWUVI (Facility ID: 66988)

Defunct radio stations in the United States
Radio stations established in 1985
1985 establishments in the United States Virgin Islands
Radio stations disestablished in 2019
2019 disestablishments in the United States Virgin Islands
UVI
2012 establishments in the United States Virgin Islands
UVI
Charlotte Amalie, U.S. Virgin Islands
College radio stations in the United States
University of the Virgin Islands
Pacifica Foundation stations